Agrasen Ki Baoli (also known as Ugrasen Ki Baoli) is a 60-meter long and 15-meter wide historical step well in New Delhi, India.

Located on Hailey Road, near Connaught Place, Jantar Mantar, it was designated a protected monument by the Archaeological Survey of India (ASI) under the Ancient Monuments and Archaeological Sites and Remains Act of 1958.

Although there are no known historical records to prove who built the stepwell, it is believed that it was originally built by the legendary king Agrasen, and the present architecture hints at it being rebuilt in the 14th century during the Tughlag or Lodi period of the Delhi Sultanate. The Baoli is open daily from 9 AM to 5:30 PM.

Toponymy
Baoli or bawdi, also referred to as baori or bauri, is a Hindi word (from Sanskrit  or). Water temples and temple step wells were built in ancient India. The earliest forms of step well and reservoir were also built in India in places like Dholavira as far back as the Indus Valley civilisation.

Architecture

This Baoli, with 108 steps, is among a few of its kind in Delhi. Three levels of the historic stepwell are visible. Each level is lined with arched niches on both sides. From an architectural perspective, this step well was probably rebuilt during the Tughlaq or Lodi period and is flanked by a small three-sided mosque towards the west.

In popular culture 
The location has been used to shoot scenes from various Bollywood films such as the blockbuster film PK starring Aamir Khan and Sultan starring Salman Khan. It was also featured in the 2017 Sridevi thriller Mom. The step well also appeared on the second episode of The Amazing Race Australia 2 in 2012.

There are also urban legends of the step-well being haunted.

Gallery

See also
Chand Baori
History of Delhi
Johad
Rani ki vav
Water well
Agrasen

Notes

References

External links

History of Delhi
Tourist attractions in Delhi
Stepwells in Delhi
Monuments of National Importance in Delhi
Memorials to Agrasen
Hindu architecture
Architecture of the Delhi Sultanate
Architecture of the Tughlaq dynasty
Architecture of the Lodi dynasty
Water Heritage Sites in India